Malwa is a geographical region in the south of Punjab state in India. It is located between Haryana, Rajasthan, Sutlej and Ghaggar rivers.

Districts of Malwa
The following districts are classified as Malwa:

 Barnala
 Bathinda
 Faridkot
 Fatehgarh Sahib
 Fazilka
 Firozpur
 Ludhiana
 Malerkotla
 Mansa
 Moga
 Mohali
 Muktsar Sahib
 Patiala
 Sangrur

Parts of these districts also speak Malwai Punjabi, and are considered a part of Malwa
 Sirsa
 Fatehabad

See also
 Doaba
 Majha
 Poadh
 Malwai Giddha

References

 Mahankosh, Bhai Kahn Singh Nabha

Geography of Punjab, India
Landforms of Punjab, India
Plains of India
Regions of India
Regions of Punjab, India